339 Lafayette Street, nicknamed the Peace Pentagon, and officially numbered 339-345, is a building in the NoHo neighborhood of Manhattan, New York City known in the late 20th and early 21st century for the many left-wing and radical activist and political organizations headquartered there. The building was completed c.1920.

History
The War Resisters League began to rent the building in 1968, and purchased  it in 1974 for $60,000.

In 1978 the A. J. Muste Institute bought the building from the War Resisters League for $91,000.  For decades the Institute provided office space to politically congenial activist organizations at below-market rates.

In October 2015, the building was sold to the real estate holding company 337 Lafayette L.P., owned by developer Aby Rosen.

Organizations with headquarters in the building have included the Granny Peace Brigade, the National Committee to Reopen the Rosenberg Case, the Socialist Party USA, the Metropolitan Council on Housing, Women's Pentagon Action, Catholic Peace Fellowship, Episcopal Churchmen for South Africa, the New York Anti-Nuclear Group, the Infant Formula Action Coalition, Art for Social Change, Political Art Documentation/Distribution, the Fund for Open Information and Accountability, NYC Shut It Down, and Paper Tiger Television.

References

External links

Office buildings in Manhattan
Peace organizations based in the United States